Valmir Prascidelli (born 9 April 1964) is a Brazilian politician. He has spent his political career representing São Paulo, having served as federal deputy representative from 2015 to 2019.

Personal life
Prascidelli is the son of Lourenço Prascidelli and Elza Bragante.

Political career
Prascidelli voted against the impeachment motion of then-president Dilma Rousseff. Prascidelli voted in opposition to the 2017 Brazilian labor reform, and would vote in favor of a corruption investigation into Rousseff's successor Michel Temer.

Prascidelli ran for mayor of Osasco in 2016, but only received 9,850 votes or 3.54%, placing him fifth among all the candidates.

References

1964 births
Living people
People from Osasco
Mayors of places in Brazil
Workers' Party (Brazil) politicians
Members of the Chamber of Deputies (Brazil) from São Paulo